"Canada on Strike" is the fourth episode in the twelfth season of the American animated television series South Park. The 171st episode of the series overall, it first aired on Comedy Central in the United States on April 2, 2008. In the episode, the nation of Canada, feeling disrespected by the rest of the world, goes on a general strike, demanding money, spurring the boys to raise money by creating a viral video.

Written and directed by series co-creator Trey Parker, the episode was inspired by the 2007–2008 Writers Guild of America strike. It features appearances by the creators of a number of famous viral videos. The episode was rated TV-MA L for strong language in the United States.

Plot
Mr. Mackey informs the students that it is Canada Appreciation Day and plays a video in which Stephen Abootman, President of the World Canadian Bureau (initialism: WGA), asks the students to remember all of Canada's contributions to the world. When he asks "When you think of Canada, what's the one thing that comes to mind?", Cartman responds "Gayness!" and when Abootman asks, "What is it that makes Canada so important?", Craig replies "Nothing!" before all the other students laugh and ridicule the Canadians.

In Canada, Abootman learns of the world's lackluster response to Canada Appreciation Day, and resolves to have the country go on strike, spurring the Canadians to break out into a choreographed song and dance number.

When Abootman and his cohorts announce the strike to an assembly of world leaders, the other countries' delegates are confused as to what exactly Canada wants. Abootman responds "more money", but when asked where this money should come from, he exclaims "the Internet makes lots of money. Give us some of that money!" When the other delegates try to explain that they cannot give Canada money, Abootman is insulted, storms out and shouts that the strike will continue.

Later, Kyle is watching Ike, his adopted brother from Canada, stand outside his house, picketing. Kyle approaches the other boys with worries about his brother, but they are too busy watching Terrance and Phillip to care. After realizing that all the Terrance and Phillip episodes are reruns, they attempt to call Abootman to end the strike, as Cartman doesn’t want to watch American comedy, followed by a pastiche of Family Guy. 

While on the phone with him, they agree that Canada deserves more money but they do not have any to give. In a plan to raise money from the Internet, the boys post a video on "YouToob" of Butters singing Samwell's "What What (In the Butt)". It goes viral, but in order to claim their money at the Colorado Department of Internet Money, the boys must wait in line behind other Internet video sensations, such as Laughing Baby, Dramatic Chipmunk, Tay Zonday, Afro Ninja, Sneezing Panda, Cara Cunningham, Tron Guy, Star Wars Kid, and Numa Numa Guy. In an argument over who is more famous, most of the other Internet celebrities kill each other. The boys advance in line, and they receive 10 million "theoretical dollars", which are printed on clear plastic cheques with no monetary value.

As the strike continues, many Canadians are dying of starvation, and a news report shows that the United States has brought in Danish people to fill their positions, as some of the scab Danes note that the Danish are "the Canadians of Europe." When Terrance and Phillip question the value of the strike, Abootman questions their loyalty, and vows to continue.

When the boys present him their theoretical dollars, Abootman is outraged and refuses to call off the strike until he feels he has won something, at which point Kyle convinces the world leaders to give Canada a consolation prize of bubblegum and Bennigan's coupons. With the strike settled, the boys go home, where Kyle gives his latest "you know, I learned something today" monologue: he notes that the Internet has a lot of fun content but does not have distribution channels that can monetize that material like traditional outlets, and it's unwise to throw away current revenues instead of taking some time to see how the Internet does mature into a viable marketplace for content creators. Stan says "Yeah." 

After Abootman throws a celebration party to celebrate the end of the strike, treating it as a great victory for Canada, Terrance and Phillip gatecrash the party and reveal to the Canadian public that they lost $10.4 million by not working during the strike, while the gumballs and coupons were worth roughly $3,008, which would have ended the strike far sooner. As punishment, Abootman and his men are banished by being set adrift on an ice floe.

Theme
The episode was a criticism of the 2007–2008 Writers Guild of America strike. TV Squad's Brad Trechak noted that "Trey Parker and Matt Stone are not members of any of the unions, and they negotiated Internet profit-sharing before it became an issue for the WGA. They have also remained consistent with their dislike of the Hollywood creative elite (including actors and writers, although they are both) and their willingness to take a different viewpoint than the popular media." IGN's Travis Fickett stated that "It was probably inevitable that South Park would comment on the writers' strike in some fashion, and here they do – by way of Canada." The A.V. Club's Josh Modell suggested that "it's clear that Parker and Stone feel that the writers completely screwed themselves in the long run, but that subplot is almost beside the point."

In the DVD commentary the creators claim the episode is a "docudrama" instead of a parody of the strike. The strike took place during the making of "The List" during which the creators lamented that they had to work instead of joining with the strike.

Reception
Josh Modell of The A.V. Club gave the episode an A grade, saying that it "was a great episode because the jokes came quick and funny, not because there was some huge point to be made". A notable part of the episode for him was the viral video, "What What (In The Butt)".

Travis Fickett of IGN gave the episode a rating of 7.6. He noted that though it was an "issue" episode, it was still humorous, unlike other such episodes like "Britney's New Look". Overall, while it wasn't a bad episode "the show muddles the argument it's trying to make by letting the parallels to Canada get off track."

Brad Trechak of TV Squad noted especially "the battle royal scene with all the YouTube people" and the "scintillating conversation" of the Canadians at the episode end. Trechak was "happy to see South Park get back on track to the focus and humor from the previous seasons."

Lawsuit
In November 2010, Comedy Central and Viacom, Comedy Central's parent company, were sued for copyright infringement for their recreation of the viral video, What What (In the Butt). The case was dismissed with prejudice before discovery. Brownmark Films appealed in the 7th Circuit Court of Appeals, which ruled in favor of Comedy Central in June 2012, holding that the parody was protected under fair use laws, and noting that, as demonstrated in the episode, Brownmark's loss of revenue could only be measured in the sense of "Internet dollars" and of no measurable commercial value; if anything, South Park's lampooning of What What (In the Butt) "would only increase [the original video's] ad revenue" on YouTube.

Home release
"Canada on Strike", along with the thirteen other episodes from South Park'''s twelfth season, were released on a three-disc DVD set and two-disc Blu-ray set in the United States on March 10, 2009. The sets included brief audio commentaries by Parker and Stone for each episode, a collection of deleted scenes, and two special mini-features, The Making of Major Boobage and Six Days to South Park''.

References

External links
 "Canada on Strike" Full episode at South Park Studios
 

South Park (season 12) episodes
Writers Guild of America
Canada–United States relations in South Park
Television episodes about Internet culture
Television episodes set in Canada

it:Episodi di South Park (dodicesima stagione)#Canadesi alla riscossa